The 2018 Illinois State Redbirds football team represented Illinois State University as a member of the Missouri Valley Football Conference (MVFC) during the 2018 NCAA Division I FCS football season. Led by tenth-year head coach Brock Spack, the Redbirds compiled an overall record of 6–5 with a mark of 3–5 in conference play, placing in a three-way tie for sixth in the MVFC. Illinois State played home games at Hancock Stadium in Normal, Illinois.

Preseason

Preseason MVFC poll
The MVFC released their preseason poll on July 29, 2018, with the Redbirds predicted to finish in fifth place.

Preseason All-MVFC Teams
The Redbirds placed five players on the preseason all-MVFC teams.

Offense

1st team

James Robinson – RB

Spencer Schnell – WR

Drew Himmelman – OL

2nd team

Tylor Petkovich – TE

Defense

2nd team

Mitchell Brees – DB

Schedule

Game summaries

Saint Xavier

Eastern Illinois

at Colorado State

at Missouri State

Western Illinois

Southern Illinois

at North Dakota State

South Dakota State

at Northern Iowa

at Indiana State

Youngstown State

Ranking movements

References

Illinois State
Illinois State Redbirds football seasons
Illinois State Redbirds football